Filaria is a genus of nematodes belonging to the family Filariidae.

The genus has cosmopolitan distribution.

Species:

Filaria acutiuscula 
Filaria bufonis 
Filaria loliginis 
Filaria martis 
Filaria piscium 
Filaria smithi 
Filaria terebra 
Filaria tuberculata 
Filaria volvulans 
Filaria volvulas 
Filaria volvulus 
Filaria volvulxus

References

Nematodes